In human anatomy, the fibularis tertius (also known as the peroneus tertius) is a muscle in the anterior compartment of the leg. It acts to tilt the sole of the foot away from the midline of the body (eversion) and to pull the foot upward toward the body (dorsiflexion).

Structure 
The fibularis tertius arises from the lower third of the front surface of the fibula, the lower part of the interosseous membrane, and septum, or connective tissue, between it and the fibularis brevis. The septum is sometimes called the intermuscular septum of Otto.

The muscle passes downward and ends in a tendon that passes under the superior extensor retinaculum and the inferior extensor retinaculum of the foot in the same canal as the extensor digitorum longus muscle. It may be mistaken as a fifth tendon of the extensor digitorum longus. The tendon inserts into the medial part of the posterior surface of the shaft of the fifth metatarsal bone.

The fibularis tertius is supplied by the deep fibular nerve. In rare cases, it may also be supplied by the common fibular nerve. This is unlike the other fibularis muscles, which are located in the lateral compartment of the leg and are supplied by the superficial fibular nerve, since the fibularis tertius is found in the anterior compartment of the leg.

The fibularis tertius may be absent in humans. It may be absent in as few as 5% of people, or as many as 72%, depending on the population surveyed. It is rarely found in other primates, which is one reason its function has been linked to efficient bipedalism.

Function 
As a weak dorsiflexor of the ankle joint, the fibularis tertius assists in pulling the foot upward toward the body. It also assists in tilting the sole of the foot away from midline of the body at the ankle (eversion). It is likely to be helpful though not essential in bipedal walking.

Clinical significance 
The fibularis tertius may be involved in ankle injuries and may rupture. This is caused by hyperextension. 

The fibularis tertius may be imaged using medical ultrasound.

Nomenclature and etymology 
Terminologia Anatomica designates "fibularis" as the preferred word over "peroneus.".

The word "peroneus" comes from the Greek word "perone," meaning pin of a brooch or a buckle. In medical terminology, the word refers to being of or relating to the fibula or to the outer portion of the leg.

Other animals 
The fibularis tertius muscle in horses originates from the near the lateral condyle of the femur, passes through the extensor sulcus on the head of the tibia, and inserts onto the third metatarsal bone, the third and fourth tarsal bones, and the calcaneus. Rupture of the muscle may cause the Achilles tendon to have a slight dip.

Additional images

See also 
 Fibularis muscles
 Fibularis longus
 Fibularis brevis

References

External links 

  - "The Leg: Muscles"
 PTCentral

Muscles of the lower limb